The Emmett Kelly Museum in Sedan, Kansas, nominally honors their native son, the famed circus clown. The museum houses a mix of local memorabilia along with a few Kelly-related items, but its main attraction is  the world's largest collection of commemorative Jim Beam bottles, some 1,500, donated by a couple who once took them on tour.

References

External links
 Emmett Kelly Museum

Kelly, Emmett
Museums in Chautauqua County, Kansas
Circus museums in the United States
History museums in Kansas